Blackbriar may refer to:

 Blackbriar (band), a Dutch music group
 Blackbriar (novel), by William Sleator, 1972
 Blackbriar Thorn, a DC Comics character
 Project Blackbriar, a plot element in the Bourne film series

See also
Brier (disambiguation)